Aces Back to Back may refer to:
 Aces Back to Back (CD/DVD), a CD/DVD set compiled in 2004 from Bobby Darin recordings
 Aces Back to Back (book), a history of the Grateful Dead written by Scott W. Allen, first published in 1992 by Outskirts Press
 Aces Back to Back (jazz compilation), a set of four compact discs released in 1998 by label 32 Jazz, featuring Rahsaan Roland Kirk
 "Aces Back to Back", an episode of the TV series Mr. Lucky that aired January 2, 1960